Macropoliana is a genus of moths in the family Sphingidae. The genus was erected by Robert Herbert Carcasson in 1968. It is found in Central and Southern Africa.

Species
Macropoliana afarorum Rougeot 1975
Macropoliana asirensis Wiltshire 1980
Macropoliana cadioui Haxaire & Camiade, 2008
Macropoliana ferax (Rothschild & Jordan 1916)
Macropoliana gessi Schmit, 2006
Macropoliana natalensis (Butler 1875)
Macropoliana scheveni Carcasson 1972

References 

 
Sphingini
Moth genera